is the 47th single by Japanese idol girl group AKB48. It was released in Japan on 15 March 2017. The title song is used as the theme song of their drama Tofu Pro-Wrestling premiered on January 21, 2017.

History 
The release of the single was announced at an AKB48's handshake meeting held at Pacifico Yokohama on 4 February 2017. The list of the 32 members who will participate on the title track was also announced at the same meeting. Haruna Kojima was announced as the center performer for the title track, her first time in two years, and third time overall and also her final appearance on an AKB48 Single. This is the first single to release after Haruka Shimazaki graduated from the group.

It sold 933,969 copies on its first day, less than their previous single, "High Tension".

Four days before official release of "Shoot Sign", AKB48 performed for the first time their 48th and upcoming single "Negaigoto no Mochigusare" during NCON (a school choir contest promoted by NHK).

Music video 
The complete version of the music video premiered on Japanese Space Shower TV on March 3, 2017. The main set for this music video is a WIP (World Idol Pro-Wrestling) ring.

Track listings 
All lyrics by Yasushi Akimoto.

Type A

Type B

Type C

Type D

Type E

Theater Edition

Senbatsu

Shoot Sign
 Team A: Haruna Kojima , Anna Iriyama, Shizuka Ōya, Yui Yokoyama
 Team K: Minami Minegishi, Mion Mukaichi, Tomu Muto
 Team B: Yuki Kashiwagi, Rena Kato, Yuria Kizaki, Mayu Watanabe
 Team 4: Nana Okada, Saya Kawamoto, Mako Kojima, Haruka Komiyama, Juri Takahashi
 Team 8: Yui Oguri, Momoka Onishi
 SKE48 Team S: Jurina Matsui 
 SKE48 Team E: Rara Goto, Akari Suda
 NMB48 Team N: Miori Ichikawa, Ayaka Yamamoto, Sayaka Yamamoto
 NMB48 Team M: Miru Shiroma, Akari Yoshida
 HKT48 Team H: Haruka Kodama, Rino Sashihara
 HKT48 Team KIV: Sakura Miyawaki
 NGT48 Team NIII: Rie Kitahara, Rika Nakai

Kidzuka Renai you ni...
Sang by Haruna Kojima as her graduation song from the group. 
 Team A: Haruna Kojima

Accident Chu
Sang by AKB48's U-19 Senbatsu, with the members being under the age of 19 at the time of this single's release.
 Team A: Megu Taniguchi, Yui Hiwatashi
 Team K: Mion Mukaichi 
 Team B: Rena Kato, Moe Goto, Seina Fukuoka
 Team 4: Nana Okada, Saya Kawamoto, Mako Kojima, Haruka Komiyama, Juri Takahashi, Yuiri Murayama
 Team 8: Yui Oguri, Narumi Kuranoo, Nagisa Sakaguchi, Nanami Sato
 Team Kenkyuusei: Satone Kubo, Erii Chiba

Vacancy
Sang by SKE48.
 Team S: Ryoha Kitagawa, Haruka Futamura, Jurina Matsui 
 Team KII: Yuna Ego, Mina Oba, Yuna Obata, Sarina Souda, Akane Takayanagi, Nao Furuhata, Kaori Matsumura
 Team E: Kanon Kimoto, Haruka Kumazaki, Rara Goto, Makiko Saito, Maya Sugawara, Akari Suda, Marika Tani

Mayonaka no Tsuyogari
Sang by NMB48.
 Team N: Miori Ichikawa, Kei Jonishi, Ririka Sutou, Airi Tanigawa, Shu Yabushita, Ayaka Yamamoto, Sayaka Yamamoto 
 Team M: Yuuka Kato,  Momoka Kinoshita, Miru Shiroma , Nagisa Shibuya, Akari Yoshida
 Team BII: Azusa Uemura, Yuuri Ota, Ayaka Okita, Reina Fujie, Sae Murase, Fuuko Yagura

Tomaranai Kanransha
Sang by HKT48.
 Team H: Yuriya Inoue, Yui Kojina, Haruka Kodama , Rino Sashihara, Meru Tashima, Miku Tanaka, Natsumi Matsuoka, Nako Yabuki
 Team KIV: Yuka Tanaka, Mio Tomonaga, Mai Fuchigami, Sakura Miyawaki, Aoi Motomura, Madoka Moriyasu
 Team TII: Sae Kurihara, Hana Matsuoka, Emiri Yamashita
 Team Kenkyuusei: Tomoka Takeda

Midori to Mori no Undokouen
Sang by NGT48.
 Team NIII: Yuka Ogino, Tsugumi Oguma, Yuki Kashiwagi, Minami Kato, Rie Kitahara, Anju Sato, Riko Sugahara, Moeka Takakura , Ayaka Tano, Rika Nakai, Marina Nishigata, Rena Hasegawa, Hinata Homma, Fuka Murakamo, Maho Yamaguchi, Noe Yamada
 NGT48 Kenkyuusei: Yuria Otaki, Yuria Kado, Aina Kusakabe, Reina Seiji, Mau Takahashi, Ayuka Nakamura, Miharu Nara, Nanako Nishimura, Ayaka Mizusawa, Aya Miyajima

Dare no Koto wo Ichiban Aishiteru?
Sang by SakamichiAKB, with the members consisting of AKB48 and Sakamichi Series members.
 Team K: Mion Mukaichi
 Team 4: Nana Okada, Mako Kojima
 Team 8: Yui Oguri 
 Team S: Jurina Matsui
 Nogizaka46 1st Generation: Marika Itō, Asuka Saitō, Minami Hoshino
 Nogizaka46 2nd Generation: Hinako Kitano, Ranze Terada, Miona Hori
 Kanji Keyakizaka46: Yui Imaizumi, Yūka Sugai, Yurina Hirate , Rika Watanabe, Risa Watanabe
 Hiragana Keyakizaka46: Neru Nagahama

Kanashii Uta wo Kikitaku Natta
Sang by MayuYukirin, who are known to have a good relationship with one another.
 Team B: Mayu Watanabe, Yuki Kashiwagi

Release history

Notes

References

External links 
 Profile on the AKB48 official website 

AKB48 songs
2017 singles
2017 songs
Songs with lyrics by Yasushi Akimoto
King Records (Japan) singles
Oricon Weekly number-one singles
Billboard Japan Hot 100 number-one singles
Japanese television drama theme songs